Loup Verlet (24 May 1931 – 13 June 2019) was a French physicist who pioneered the computer simulation of molecular dynamics models.  In a famous 1967 paper he used what is now known as Verlet integration (a method for the numerical integration of equations of motion) and the Verlet list (a data structure that keeps track of each molecule's immediate neighbors in order to speed computer calculations of molecule-to-molecule interactions).  He received his PhD in 1957; his PhD work was initially conducted in the group of Victor Weisskopf at the Massachusetts Institute of Technology and concluded under the guidance of Maurice Lévy at the École normale supérieure in Paris. From 1957 to 1993 he worked mostly on the physics of the liquid state.

He also wrote about the history of science.  In his book "La Malle de Newton" (1993) he argued that Isaac Newton was an important transition figure between the medieval, mainly religious, world of ideas and the modern scientific way of analyzing physical problems. Newton had a foot in both worlds, as shown by the fact that his writings are not only concerned with mathematics and physics, but also theology and alchemy, a combination that might seem bizarre by modern standards. The publication of Newton's Principia in 1687 and the Glorious Revolution of 1688 (with the king's powers limited by an elected Parliament) were the key events that brought the old era to a close and ushered in the modern one.

His last book was 'Chimères et Paradoxes' (Ed. Cerf, 2007), an extended essay that touches on the philosophy of science as well as the history of science.  Among other things, it considers how three great thinkers (Descartes, Newton and Freud) changed our world view.

Bibliography 

L. Verlet: "Computer Experiments on Classical Fluids", PhysRev. Vol. 159, No. 98, July 1967
D. Levesque and L. Verlet: Molecular-dynamics and time reversibility. J. Stat. Phys., 72(3-4), 1993.

References

1931 births
2019 deaths
French physicists